Poldine Demoski Carlo (December 5, 1920 – May 9, 2018) was an American author and an elder of the Koyukon Alaskan Athabaskans, native people of Alaska.

Born in Nulato, Territory of Alaska, Carlo was a founding member of the Fairbanks Native Association (FNA) and also served for the Alaska Bicentennial Commission board, as well as a consultant for the Tanana Chiefs Conference (TCC). She was the author of Nulato: An Indian Life on the Yukon, which was dedicated in memory of her son, Stewart, who died in 1975 in an auto accident.

Carlo married William "Bill" Carlo in 1940. The marriage produced eight children: five sons (William Jr., Kenny, Walter, Glenn and Stewart), and three daughters (Dorothy, Lucy and Kathleen). She resided in Fairbanks, Alaska.

A building in downtown Fairbanks owned by FNA was christened the Poldine Carlo Building in her honor.

References

Koyukon
1920 births
2018 deaths
Alaskan Athabaskan people
Native American writers
Writers from Fairbanks, Alaska
People from Yukon–Koyukuk Census Area, Alaska
Native American women writers
20th-century Native American women
20th-century Native Americans
21st-century Native American women
21st-century Native Americans
20th-century American women writers
21st-century American women writers